Farakhi, Farrakhi, Farokhi, Farrokhi, Farrukhi, Farukhi or Farkhi (Urdu: فرخی) is a Persian and Urdu name that may refer to:
Farrukhi Sistani (c.980–1037), Persian poet
Asif Farrukhi, Pakistani writer, editor and translator 
Aslam Farrukhi (1923–2016), Pakistani Urdu author, critic, poet, linguist, scholar and broadcaster 
Bahram Rashidi Farrokhi (born 1992), Iranian football forward 
Mohammad Farrokhi Yazdi (1889–1939), Iranian poet, journalist and politician 
Parviz Farrokhi (born 1968), Iranian beach volleyball player

See also
Farrakhan

Persian-language surnames
Urdu-language surnames
Persian masculine given names
Patronymic surnames
Surnames from given names